Victor L. Butterfield (February 7, 1904 – November 19, 1975) was an American philosopher and educator who served as the eleventh President of Wesleyan University from 1943 to 1967.

Early life and education 

He was born February 7, 1904, in Kingston, Rhode Island to Kenyon L. Butterfield and Harriet M Butterfield. He attended Cornell University and received his B.A. in 1927 and M.A. in 1928. In 1936 he earned a Ph.D. from Harvard.

References

Presidents of Wesleyan University
1904 births
1975 deaths
Wesleyan University faculty
Cornell University alumni
Harvard University alumni
20th-century American academics